Kevin Jermaine "Kay-Jay" Harris (born March 27, 1979) is a former American football running back. He was signed by the Miami Dolphins as an undrafted free agent in 2005. He played college football at West Virginia.

Harris has also been a member of the St. Louis Rams and New York Giants.

Early years
Harris played football, baseball, basketball, and track at Tampa Bay Technical High School in Tampa, Florida. He was drafted by the Texas Rangers for baseball and played four years of Class A ball before concentrating on football.

College career
Harris attended Garden City Community College in Garden City, Kansas before transferring to West Virginia for his final two years. In two years with the Mountaineers, Harris started six of 23 games played, rushing for 1,483 yards and 14 touchdowns on 256 attempts, and added 25 receptions for 292 yards and three touchdowns. He also earned second-team all-Big East honors as a senior, rushing for 959 yards and 10 touchdowns on 165 carries, adding 20 receptions for 181 yards and three touchdowns.

On September 4, 2004, he set a West Virginia and Big East Conference record for rushing yards in a single game. He ran for 337 yards and four touchdowns on 25 carries against East Carolina despite not starting the game. West Virginia went on to win by a score of 56-23.

Professional career

Miami Dolphins
Harris went undrafted in the 2005 NFL Draft and was later signed with the Miami Dolphins. He spent the 2005 season on the team's practice squad.

St. Louis Rams
Harris was signed by the St. Louis Rams in 2006, where he backed up Steven Jackson and Stephen Davis.

In the 2007 preseason, Harris had three carries for 25 yards against the Minnesota Vikings. However, he was waived prior to the regular season.

New York Giants
Harris was signed to the practice squad of the New York Giants during the 2007 season, where he remained during the team's Super Bowl XLII victory over the New England Patriots. He re-signed with the team in the 2008 offseason. However, Harris suffered an ankle injury during a preseason game against the Cleveland Browns on August 18 and was carted off the field. He was waived/injured two days later.

References

External links
New York Giants bio
Baseball Reference bio

1979 births
Living people
African-American players of American football
American football running backs
West Virginia Mountaineers football players
Miami Dolphins players
St. Louis Rams players
New York Giants players
Garden City Broncbusters football players
Savannah Sand Gnats players
Pulaski Rangers players
Baseball players from Tampa, Florida
Players of American football from Tampa, Florida
21st-century African-American sportspeople
20th-century African-American sportspeople